Easy A (stylized as easy A) is a 2010 American teen romantic
comedy film directed by Will Gluck, written by Bert V. Royal, starring Emma Stone, Stanley Tucci, Patricia Clarkson, Thomas Haden Church, Dan Byrd, Amanda Bynes, Penn Badgley, Cam Gigandet, Lisa Kudrow, Aly Michalka, and Malcolm McDowell. The screenplay was partially inspired by the 1850 novel The Scarlet Letter by Nathaniel Hawthorne.

Shot at Screen Gems studios and in Ojai, California, the film was released on September 17, 2010. The film received positive reviews with high praise for Stone's performance, and was a major financial success, grossing $75 million worldwide against a budget of $8 million. Stone received a Golden Globe nomination for Best Actress in a Comedy or Musical, while the movie won the Critics' Choice Award for Best Comedy.

The film is ranked as number 14 on Entertainment Weekly's 2021 list of the Best High School Movies.

Plot
The story is narrated by Olive Penderghast, a 17-year-old high school girl living in Ojai, California, speaking into her webcam.

Olive lies to her best friend, Rhiannon Abernathy, about going on a date in order to get out of camping with Rhiannon's hippie parents. Instead, she hangs around the house all weekend listening to Natasha Bedingfield's 2008 song "Pocketful of Sunshine" from a musical greeting card her grandmother sent her. The following Monday, Rhiannon presses Olive until she lies about losing her virginity to a college boy. Marianne Bryant, a devout Christian whom Olive considers to be prudish, overhears her telling the lie and it soon spreads throughout the school. The school's church group, run by Marianne, decides to "save" Olive from her supposed promiscuity. Olive confides the truth to her friend Brandon, who is bullied by other students for being gay. Brandon asks Olive to pretend to have sex with him at a party so the other students will believe he is straight, to which she agrees.

After a fight with Rhiannon over her new reputation as a "dirty skank", Olive decides to counteract the harassment by embracing her new image as the school tramp, wearing more provocative clothing and stitching a red "A" onto her clothing, inspired by Hester Prynne from Nathaniel Hawthorne's 1850 novel The Scarlet Letter. Boys who have had no previous luck with girls beg Olive to increase their popularity by saying they have had sex with her, which she does in exchange for gift cards to various stores. Things get worse when Micah, Marianne's boyfriend, contracts chlamydia from sleeping with Mrs. Griffith, the school guidance counselor, and blames Olive. As Mrs. Griffith's husband, Mr. Griffith, is Olive's favorite teacher, she accepts the blame to spare their marriage.

The church youth group, which now includes Rhiannon, begins harassing Olive in an attempt to get her to drop out of school. Olive gets asked out on a date by Anson, Rhiannon's crush, which ends badly when Anson tries to bribe Olive to actually have sex with him and not just pretend that she did. Olive later reconnects with Todd, her childhood crush and the school mascot, who tells her he does not believe the rumors because she lied for him when he was not ready for his first kiss years ago. Olive decides to ask everyone she lied for to help her by telling everyone the truth, but nobody is willing to relinquish their newfound popularity. When Mrs. Griffith also refuses to tell the truth, Olive threatens to expose her affair, but Mrs. Griffith says no one would believe her. Out of spite, Olive immediately tells Mr. Griffith, who subsequently separates from his wife.

After talking with her open-minded mother, Olive comes up with a plan - she does a song-and-dance number at a school pep rally to get people's attention and tells them to watch her webcast later that night, promising an online sex show with Todd when in reality, it is the webcast that has served as the narrative device for the film. As she is finishing up her webcast, Todd comes by her house riding a lawn mower. She signs off by saying that she may lose her virginity to Todd sooner or later, but declares that "it is nobody's goddamn business." Olive texts Rhiannon and apologizes for lying to her. She goes outside to meet Todd and the two share a kiss before riding off on the lawn mower.

Cast

 Emma Stone as Olive Penderghast
 Juliette Goglia as young Olive
 Penn Badgley as "Woodchuck" Todd
 Braeden Lemasters as young Todd
 Amanda Bynes as Marianne Bryant
 Dan Byrd as Brandon
 Aly Michalka as Rhiannon Abernathy
 Thomas Haden Church as Mr. Griffith
 Lisa Kudrow as Mrs. Griffith
 Patricia Clarkson as Rosemary Penderghast
 Stanley Tucci as Dill Penderghast
 Cam Gigandet as Micah
 Malcolm McDowell as Principal Gibbons
 Mahaley Patel as Nina Howell
 Jake Sandvig as Anson
 Bryce Clyde Jenkins as Chip Penderghast
 Johanna Braddy as Melody Bostic
 Fred Armisen as Pastor Bryant
 Stacey Travis as Mrs. Bryant
 Max Crumm as Pontius
 Yoshi Sudarso as Eric Ling
 Lalaine as Gossipy Girl

Production

Development
Screenwriter Bert V. Royal claims to have written the entire screenplay, except for the last ten pages, in five days. Royal's plan was to adapt three classic works into films and to set them at the same high school, so that some characters would appear in multiple films. Besides The Scarlet Letter, which was the source material for Easy A, Royal wanted to adapt Cyrano de Bergerac and The Mystery of Edwin Drood. Natasha Bedingfield's song "Pocketful of Sunshine", which becomes a running joke in the film, was not in Royal's original script. He envisioned "Olive", a track from Ken Nordine's 1966 album Colors, to play during Olive's weekend montage (which introduces the song). Director Will Gluck's favorite film is Ferris Bueller's Day Off and has multiple homages to it in the film (Olive's shower Mohawk, "never had one lesson"), among many other John Hughes references. According to Royal, although the word "fuck" appeared 47 times in the original draft, which was written as an R-rated comedy, all occurrences were cut from the final film. However, Gluck shot two versions of many scenes, both with and without the coarser language. Although the film was cut down for a wider audience, the film still obtained a 15 rating in the United Kingdom.

Filming
Gluck credits Stone with improvising the line about being a "Gossip Girl in the Sweet Valley of Traveling Pants". The entire film was shot in Ojai, California in the summer of 2009, using Panavision's Genesis and later filmized. Not a single film set was used; even the houses in the film belong to Ojai residents. The school used as "Ojai North High School" in the film is Nordhoff High School, and the end credits are filmed on Fordyce Road, both located in Ojai, California.

Soundtrack

The soundtrack was released by Madison Gate Records on September 14, 2010, and is available via iTunes. It features tracks from Jessie J, Lenka, Natasha Bedingfield, Kardinal Offishall, and Cary Brothers. Other songs in the film but not on the soundtrack album are from OneRepublic, Angus & Julia Stone, The Dollyrots, Death Cab for Cutie, and The Pussycat Dolls.

Release

Easy A had its world premiere at the 2010 Toronto International Film Festival.

Home media

Easy A was released on DVD and Blu-ray Disc on December 21, 2010. The DVD features a gag reel, Emma Stone's audition footage, an audio commentary with director Gluck and Stone, and previews. Blu-ray exclusive bonus features include: The Making of Easy A, The School of Pop Culture: Movies of the '80s, Vocabulary of Hilarity and a trivia track.

Reception

Box office
The film opened on September 17, 2010, and grossed $6,787,163 on its opening day and $17,734,040 in its opening weekend, placing second behind The Town on both figures, and already making back more than double the film's slim $8 million budget. This was in line with expectations from Sony of an opening weekend take of around $15 million.
The film grossed a total of $58,401,464 in the United States and Canada plus $16,624,752 in international markets for a worldwide total of $75,026,216, earning its budget back more than nine times, making it a huge financial success.

Critical response

On the review aggregator website Rotten Tomatoes, the film has an approval rating of 85% based on 193 reviews, with an average rating of 7.1/10. The site's critical consensus reads, "It owes a huge debt to older (and better) teen comedies, but Easy A proves a smart, witty showcase for its irresistibly charming star, Emma Stone." Another review aggregator, Metacritic, assigned the film a weighted average score of 72 out of 100, based on 35 critics, indicating "generally favorable reviews". Audiences polled by CinemaScore gave the film an average grade of "A−" on an A+ to F scale.

Chicago Sun-Times film critic Roger Ebert gave the film three and a half out of four stars, writing, "Easy A offers an intriguing middle ground to the absolute of sexual abstinence: Don't sleep with anybody, but say you did. It's a funny, engaging comedy that takes the familiar but underrated Emma Stone and makes her, I believe, a star." Richard Corliss of Time magazine named Emma Stone's performance one of the ten best film performances of 2010, writing that "Stone lends winning maturity and a gift for making sassy dialogue sound natural. This 22-year-old is an actress-personality — a star — around whom Hollywood could build some pretty good movies". John Griffiths from Us Weekly gave the film two and a half stars out of four; he praised Stone, stating that "With her husky voice and fiery hair, Stone is spectacular, echoing early Lindsay Lohan", but also added that "The story is thin, and the laughs meager".

The film has been praised for redefining tropes of teen films, particularly those of the sex comedy genre. In a retrospective piece for The Washington Post, Anying Guo discussed the film's influence, pointing out the film "[subverted] sex-crazed tropes into a sharp, thoughtful film" by satirizing teens' obsession with virginity itself. Guo added, "Packed with references to “Say Anything” and other ’80s homages, the film felt refreshing against the steady churn of bildungsroman narratives that often centered on young men".

Accolades

Sequel/Spin-off
It was announced on June 20, 2019, that a spinoff film of Easy A is in development, which will be written and directed by Bert V. Royal. Further confirmation of the film came in 2021, with Aly Michalka stating "There are talks that there might be a sequel. That actually is semi real. ... It would be kind of like a new retelling but you'd see some of the characters from the original come back into the story."

References

External links

 
 
 
 
 
 

2010 films
2010 independent films
2010 romantic comedy-drama films
2010s American films
2010s coming-of-age comedy-drama films
2010s English-language films
2010s feminist films
2010s high school films
2010s teen comedy-drama films
2010s teen romance films
American feminist comedy films
American high school films
American independent films
American romantic comedy-drama films
American teen comedy-drama films
American teen romance films
Films about school bullying
Films about virginity
Films based on The Scarlet Letter
Films directed by Will Gluck
Films set in California
Films shot in California
Madison Gate Records soundtracks
Ojai, California
Screen Gems films